Nayef Mohamed Hameed (born 1929, date of death unknown) was an Iraqi athlete. He competed in the men's shot put and the men's discus throw at the 1960 Summer Olympics.

References

1929 births
Year of death missing
Athletes (track and field) at the 1960 Summer Olympics
Iraqi male shot putters
Iraqi male discus throwers
Olympic athletes of Iraq
Place of birth missing